Simon Fell is a subsidiary summit on the north east ridge of Ingleborough, a mountain in the Yorkshire Dales in Northern England.

Peaks of the Yorkshire Dales
Hewitts of England